Epicrionops petersi, or Peters' caecilian, is a species of caecilian in the family Rhinatrematidae found in Ecuador, Peru, possibly Brazil, and possibly Colombia. Its natural habitats are subtropical or tropical moist lowland forests, subtropical or tropical moist montane forests, rivers, and intermittent rivers.

References

Epicrionops
Amphibians described in 1968
Amphibians of Ecuador
Amphibians of Peru
Taxonomy articles created by Polbot